Margus Hanson (born 6 January 1958) is an Estonian politician, who was the Estonian Minister of Defence from 2003 to 2004. He is a member of the Estonian Reform Party.

Career
Hanson was born in Tartu. Between 1997 and 2003, he was a Vice-Mayor of Tartu. He has been a member of Riigikogu since 2004 and was the defense minister of Estonia from 2003 until 2004.

External sources
CV in English

1958 births
Living people
Politicians from Tartu
Defence Ministers of Estonia
20th-century Estonian politicians
21st-century Estonian politicians
Members of the Riigikogu, 2003–2007
Members of the Riigikogu, 2011–2015